Myosurus minimus is a species of flowering plant in the buttercup family known by the common name tiny mousetail or just mousetail. It is native to much of the Northern Hemisphere, including parts of Europe, Asia, North Africa, and North America. It generally grows in moist habitat types, such as riverbanks and wet meadows.

References

Jepson Manual Treatment
Flora of North America

External links
Illinois Wildflowers Photo Profile
Photo gallery

Ranunculaceae
Flora of Lebanon
Plants described in 1753
Taxa named by Carl Linnaeus